Haul Ass is the eleventh studio album by Australian electronic music group Severed Heads. After Tom Ellard's relationship soured with Nettwerk and Volition Records, he decided to release Haul Ass independently through his then newly formed Sevcom imprint, making Haul Ass the first independently released Severed Heads album since 1982's Blubberknife. The album was burned on CD-R discs, while the artwork for the jewel cases were home printed with the use of a computer printer. Two editions were made, the "standard edition", which had prominently red and grey artwork, and the "special edition", which included two extra tracks not included on the standard edition. The special edition was limited to only 1000 copies. Tom Ellard has described the album as "dark". The entire album was recorded with software called Session 8, the precursor of Pro Tools.

Track listing

Personnel
Tom Ellard - production, vocals, music
Stephen Jones - live performances
Alison Cole - live performances
Paul Mac - live performances
Ben Suthers - live performances

References

External links
 
 Bandcamp page

Severed Heads albums
1998 albums